"On the People's Democratic Dictatorship" is a speech which was written by Mao Zedong. It was presented to the public on 30 June 1949, twenty-eight years after the founding of the Chinese Communist Party (CCP). This speech is part of the fourth volume collection of his works, which was published by the Foreign Languages Press in Beijing. It is noteworthy for its tone, that it preceded the freeze in Sino-Soviet relations following the Sino-Soviet split and adoption of Maoism in China, and that it codifies and embraces people's democratic dictatorship.

Summary 
The speech opens with an allegory that compares the CCP to an aging man. At 28, Mao states the childhood of the communist party in China is over and that one day the party itself will cease to exist, as an old man dies. He argues that political parties only exist as instruments of class struggle, meaning that when classes disappear, so will the CCP.

Mao states that prior to China engaging in communism, it had tried to learn from Western countries, as Japan. However the Western imperialism made that impossible because they were formerly aggressive states. That requires cognitive dissonance to even entertain the notion that democratic reform was desirable. The on-going aggression at the time that China was trying to modernize in spite of dapped the resources China needed to enact that democratic reform and to dissuade Chinese people from enacting similar, aggressive and imperialistic forms of government.

Mao then talks passionately about the early years of the Chinese communist revolution against Chiang Kai-shek, the leader of the Kuomintang (the government of the Republic of China that ultimately relocated to Taiwan), and of destroyed and crumbling imperialist empires. He claims victory for Chinese communism and welcomes former intellectual adversaries to "learn anew" and to warm to Marxism–Leninism, a brand of communism that focuses on centralism and expanding communism first to undeveloped countries.

Mao credits the CCP for raising the standards of the working class in China and for its strong alliance with the Soviet Union. That is notable because it precedes the ideological Sino-Soviet split and establishment of Maoism as a distinct ideology.

The speech then addresses some criticisms of the CCP: leftist extremism, aggression of the CCP, foreign relations, international communism, rejection of American and British aid, cries of dictatorship. Chinese has two words that translate to dictator; the one that Mao uses has neutral connotations ("专政", which could be translated into: "monopoly on government", rather than "person who rules with an iron first and absolute power", the word used for dictator here). Mao addresses the fact that there is still some class division in China and that only "the people" deserve benevolence. He states that peaceful "reactionaries" will be given some land and forced to work until they become part of "the people".

He further states that claims of totalitarianism from the United States are hypocritical since he thinks democracy is a lie perpetuated by the ruling bourgeoisie.

Stressing the importance of the alliance between the working class and the peasantry, Mao calls for a common effort with urban bourgeoisie (a term used in this context to mean current communists but former wealth holders) to organize rural production until regulated capitalism until final socialism can extend to agriculture. He warns that the bourgeoisie should not be allowed into powerful positions of the CCP since it will likely corrupt the party for personal gain.

Mao ends the speech with a call for continued education, economic growth, and overcoming difficulties in the face of international opposition and for an embrace of Soviet assistance in modernization.

References

 On the People's Democratic Dictatorship (translated) on marxists.org

1949 speeches
Works by Mao Zedong